Hamish Scott (17 February 1924 – 12 March 2010) was a Scotland international rugby union footballer. He played at Flanker and Number Eight.

Rugby career

Amateur career

Born in Edinburgh, Scott was raised in St Andrews and attended the University of St Andrews, where he studied geology.

Scott played for St Andrews University rugby club

He briefly played for Blackheath in London before moving to Asia.

He later completed his PhD in parasitology at University of St Andrews when he then played for Madras College F.P.

Provincial career

Scott played for North of Scotland.

Whilst in Malaya he played for North Malaya at rugby.

International career

He was capped for  once in 1950, playing in the Five Nations match against England at Murrayfield Stadium on 18 March 1950. Scotland won the match 13 - 11.

He was capped at Number Eight.

Outside of rugby

He served in the Royal Navy during the Second World War aboard HMS Scorpion and was involved in escorting duties for the Russian convoy ships in the Arctic Ocean. His navy career took him to the Pacific and he served in Australia.

In 1949 he was the official photographer for a Himalayan expedition in Nepal which saw the first ascent of Paldor and the discovery of the Tilman Pass. The expedition included Norgay Tensing and was led by Bill Tilman,

He took up a post in Malaya with the colonial government as a Marine Biologist, and wrote a book on the fish off the Malaysian coast.

He was to later move to Nigeria, then Canada; where he stayed in St. Andrews, New Brunswick. He died in 2010, at Scotland's St Andrews on a visit home to Fife.

References

1924 births
2010 deaths
Scottish rugby union players
Scotland international rugby union players
Rugby union flankers
Rugby union number eights
University of St Andrews RFC players
North of Scotland (combined side) players
Madras College FP players
Blackheath F.C. players
Rugby union players from Edinburgh
Royal Navy personnel of World War II